William Weston Patton (October 19, 1821 – October 21, 1889), was an abolitionist, academic administrator, and scholar. He served as the fifth president of Howard University, and one of the contributors to the words of "John Brown's Body". He was the son of Rev. William Patton and the grandson of Anglo-Irish Congregationalist immigrant and Revolutionary War soldier Major Robert Patton.

Abolitionism 

Patton took an earnest part in the anti-slavery movement, and was chairman of the committee that presented to President Lincoln, September 13, 1862, the memorial from Chicago asking him to issue a proclamation of emancipation. 

In 1887, Patton read a paper before the Maryland Historical Society entitled "President Lincoln and the Chicago Memorial on Emancipation" recalling the actual dialogue with President Lincoln at that meeting in 1862.  The original copy of that paper is held in the Mugar Memorial Library at Boston University.  He was vice-president of the Northwestern sanitary commission during the American Civil War, and as such repeatedly visited the eastern and western armies, publishing several pamphlet, reports. In 1886, he went, on behalf of the freedmen, to Europe, where, and in the Orient, he remained nearly a year.

John Brown's Body 
In October 1861 Patton wrote new lyrics to the battle song John Brown's Body, the first with complete verses and a consistent meter. These were published in the Chicago Tribune on December 16, 1861. Even more than the previous words the new words glorify the violent anti-slavery acts of the abolitionist John Brown and his followers. The third verse directly refers to the attack on the armory in Harpers Ferry, West Virginia. Verse four compares John Brown to John the Baptist.He captured Harper’s Ferry, with his nineteen men so few,
And frightened "Old Virginny" till she trembled thru and thru;
They hung him for a traitor, themselves the traitor crew,
But his soul is marching on.

John Brown was John the Baptist of the Christ we are to see,
Christ who of the bondmen shall the Liberator be,
And soon thruout the Sunny South the slaves shall all be free,
For his soul is marching on.These themes were further refined two months later by Julia Ward Howe; her version came to be known as The Battle Hymn of the Republic. Where Patton only wrote "of the Christ we are to see", Howe testified that her eyes had already "seen the glory of the coming of the Lord".

Academic career 

Patton graduated from New York University in 1839 and Union Theological Seminary in 1842. After taking charge of a Congregational church in Boston, Massachusetts for three years, he became a pastor of one in Hartford, Connecticut, in 1846, and in Chicago, Illinois, in 1857. He received the degree of D.D. from DePauw University, Indiana, in 1864, and that of LL.D. from New York University in 1882. 

From 1867-72, he was editor of The Advance in that city, and during 1874 he was lecturer on modern skepticism at Oberlin College (Ohio) and Chicago theological seminaries. From 1877-89 he was president of Howard University (Washington, D.C.), filling the chair of natural theology and evidences of Christianity in its theological department.

Publications 
Patton is the author of The Young Man (Hartford, 1847; republished as The Young Man's Friend, Auburn, New York, 1850); Conscience and Law (New York, 1850); Slavery and Infidelity (Cincinnati, 1856); Spiritual Victory (Boston, 1874); and Prayer and Its Remarkable Answers (Chicago, 1875).
 Publications by William W. Patton, Internet Archive (archive.org). Accessed November 5, 2022.

General references

External links 
 Various Versions of the John Brown Song Spanning More Than a Century 
 Inaugural Address of The Rev. William Weston Patton as President of Howard University, October 9, 1877.
 Patton, William W. Slavery, the Bible, Infidelity: Pro-slavery Interpretations of the Bible: Productive of Infidelity (1846 book on-line)

Songwriters from New York (state)
American abolitionists
American Christian theologians
New York University alumni
Union Theological Seminary (New York City) alumni
DePauw University alumni
Oberlin College faculty
Presidents of Howard University
1821 births
1889 deaths
United States Sanitary Commission people
Activists from New York City
Christian abolitionists